Richard Karn (born Richard Karn Wilson; February 17, 1956) is an American actor, author and former game show host. He starred as Al Borland in the ABC series Home Improvement and as Fred Peters in the Hulu series Pen15. He was the fifth host of Family Feud from 2002 to 2006.

Early life 
Richard Karn Wilson was born in Seattle, Washington, on February 17, 1956. His father Gene was a Seabee who served in World War II. Richard graduated from Roosevelt High School and the University of Washington Professional Actor Training Program, where he was a member of Beta Theta Pi. Karn also gained drama experience in Scotland at the Edinburgh Festival.

After earning his drama degree in 1979, Karn moved to New York City, where in less than one week he was hired to do a commercial for Michelob beer that was featured during Super Bowl XIV. When he joined the Screen Actors Guild, he was informed there was already a Richard Wilson, prompting him to drop his last name.

Career 
In 1989, his wife Tudi convinced him to move to Los Angeles. He found a place for them to live by managing an apartment complex, catering events at a Jewish synagogue on the side. After receiving a traffic citation, Karn attended a traffic school and sat beside an agent who told him about casting for the new television show Home Improvement. The role of Al Borland had already been given to Stephen Tobolowsky, but when taping was scheduled, Tobolowsky was busy with another movie and the role had to be recast. Karn was a guest star in the pilot episode but became a regular cast member when the show was picked up by the network.

In 2002, Karn replaced Louie Anderson as the fourth individual to host the game show Family Feud. Karn left Family Feud in 2006 and was replaced by John O'Hurley.

In 2002, Karn made an appearance in The Strokes' music video for "Someday", which featured segments of the band on a fictional showing of Family Feud against the band Guided by Voices.

On October 6, 2008, Karn replaced Patrick Duffy as host of Game Show Network's Bingo America. Karn served as a substitute host on GSN Radio.

Karn did commercials for Orchard Supply Hardware in the 1990s.

Personal life 
Karn has been married to actress Tudi Roche since 1985. They have a son named Cooper.

From 1994 through 1999 Karn hosted an annual celebrity golf tournament in Seattle. In July 2002 the Karn Invitational celebrity golf event was held at Echo Falls Golf Club in Snohomish, Washington.

Filmography

Film

Television

Music videos

Books 
House Broken: How I Remodeled My Home for Just Under Three Times the Original Bid (1999) –  (with George Mair)
Handy at Home: Tips on Improving Your Home from America's Favorite Handyman (2002) –  (with George Mair)

References

External links 

 

1956 births
20th-century American actors
20th-century American male actors
21st-century American actors
21st-century American male actors
American male film actors
American game show hosts
American male comedians
American male television actors
Living people
Male actors from Seattle
University of Washington School of Drama alumni